María del Rosario Ballesteros (born 30 October 1956) is a Mexican former swimmer. She competed in two events at the 1972 Summer Olympics.

References

1956 births
Living people
Mexican female swimmers
Olympic swimmers of Mexico
Swimmers at the 1972 Summer Olympics
Place of birth missing (living people)
20th-century Mexican women